"" is the 17th single by Zard and released 8 January 1996. The single debuted at #1 rank first week. It charted for 21 weeks and sold over a million copies and became third highest-selling single in her career. When she died, it was elected as her third best song on the Oricon polls. The song is best known as the 4th Ending theme for Slam Dunk anime.

Track list
All songs are written by Izumi Sakai.

composer: Tetsurō Oda/arrangement: Takeshi Hayama
the song is used as the fourth closing theme song of the anime series Slam Dunk

composer: Mitsuyoshi Yonezawa/arrangement: Daisuke Ikeda
 (original karaoke)
 (original karaoke)

References

1996 singles
Zard songs
Songs written by Tetsurō Oda
Oricon Weekly number-one singles
Anime songs
Songs written by Izumi Sakai
1996 songs